Fall Line Studios was a start up studio, and a division of Disney Interactive Studios. It was based in Salt Lake City, Utah, U.S., and was the sister studio to Disney's Avalanche Software, also based in the city.

Fall Line Studios was dedicated to releasing games based on Disney characters, television shows, and entertainment franchises exclusively for Nintendo consoles such as the Nintendo DS and Wii systems, in addition to original titles. The company also helped develop Disney's upcoming DGamer network.

Fall Line Studios became defunct.

Video games 
 The Chronicles of Narnia: Prince Caspian
 Hannah Montana: Music Jam (co-developed with Gorilla Systems Corp.)  
 Hannah Montana: Pop Star Exclusive (co-developer with EA Canada) 
 Ultimate Band

References

External links 

Companies based in Salt Lake City
Defunct video game companies of the United States
Disney Interactive
Video game companies based in Utah
Video game companies disestablished in 2009
Video game companies established in 2006